Erlanger Spur is a rock spur from the southwestern extremity of Lexington Table, Forrestal Range, in the Pensacola Mountains of Antarctica. The spur lies south of Abele Spur and extends west toward Blount Nunatak. It was named by the Advisory Committee on Antarctic Names, at the suggestion of United States Geological Survey geologist Arthur B. Ford, after George L. Erlanger, an electronics specialist with Geophysical Survey Systems Inc, who worked with the United States Antarctic Research Program – Cold Regions Research and Engineering Laboratory survey in the Pensacola Mountains, 1973–74.

References 

Ridges of Queen Elizabeth Land